Genera Filicum was one of the important systematic works on the ferns, fully published in London in 1842.  This was a collaborative work between Sir William Jackson Hooker, who wrote the text, and Franz Bauer, illustrator.  The later Species Filicum by Hooker expanded and updated this work.

References
Nature.com
Phylogenetics and biogeography of the neotropical fern genera Jamesonia and Eriosorus (Pteridaceae) by Patricia Sánchez-Baracaldo

Works by William Jackson Hooker
1842 non-fiction books
Botany books
1840s in science